Qaza An (also Romanized as Qazā Ān; also known as Kāzwān, Qaz Ān, and Qeza’an) is a village in Qohrud Rural District, Qamsar District, Kashan County, Isfahan Province, Iran. At the 2006 census, its population was 548, in 187 families.

References 

Populated places in Kashan County